Mpumalanga is a province of South Africa. Mpumalanga may also refer to:

 Mpumalanga, KwaZulu-Natal, a town in KwaZulu-Natal
 Mpumalanga cricket team
 Mpumalanga Black Aces F.C.
 Mpumalanga Parks Board